The 1905 Cornell Big Red football team was an American football team that represented Cornell University during the 1905 college football season.  In their fourth, non-consecutive season under head coach Pop Warner, the Big Red compiled a 6–4 record and outscored all opponents by a combined total of 173 to 59. Two Cornell players received honors on the 1905 College Football All-America Team: guard Elmer Thompson (Walter Camp, 2nd team); and George Walder (New York Globe).

Schedule

References

Cornell
Cornell Big Red football seasons
Cornell Big Red football